Diuris jonesii, commonly known as Dunsborough donkey orchid, is a species of orchid that is endemic to the south-west of Western Australia. It has large, yellow, brown and mauve flowers and is found in near-coastal areas between Dunsborough and Augusta.

Description
The dorsal sepal is erect and the lateral sepals are narrow and hang downwards or sometimes cross each other. The petals are elongated and the labellum has spreading lateral lobes and a broad, flattened or folded centre lobe. The species is similar to the giant donkey orchid, D. amplissima but has smaller, less colourful flowers and a more coastal distribution. Flowering occurs from late September to October.

Taxonomy and naming
Diuris jonesii was first formally described in 2013 by Christopher French and Garry Brockman from a specimen collected at Cape Naturaliste and the description was published in Australian Orchid Review. The specific epithet (jonesii) honours David Jones.

Distribution and habitat
The Dunsborough donkey orchid grows in shrubland and woodland in near-coastal areas between Dunsborough and Augusta in the Jarrah Forest, Swan Coastal Plain and Warren biogeographic regions.

Conservation
Diuris magnifica is classified as "not threatened" by the Western Australian Government Department of Parks and Wildlife.

References

jonesii
Endemic orchids of Australia
Orchids of Western Australia
Endemic flora of Western Australia
Plants described in 2013